Potomida is a genus of bivalves belonging to the subfamily Gonideinae of the family Unionidae. 

The species of this genus are found in Eurasia.

Species
 †Potomida acarnanica 
 †Potomida attica 
 †Potomida berbestiensis 
 †Potomida bielzi 
 † Potomida breastensis 
 † Potomida clivosa 
 †Potomida cymatoides 
 † Potomida gorjensis 
 † Potomida herjei 
 † Potomida intepei 
 † Potomida kinzelbachi 
 Potomida littoralis 
 † Potomida loewenecki  (uncertain, unassessed)
 † Potomida mactraeformis  (temporary name, junior homonym of Unio mactraeformis Brusina, 1902; no replacement name or synonym known)
 † Potomida ovata  (uncertain, unassessed)
 † Potomida ponderosa 
 † Potomida prominula 
 †  Potomida seljani 
Potomida semirugata 
 †Potomida slanicensis 
 † Potomida stachei (Neumayr, 1875) 
 † Potomida subclivosa 
 † Potomida subrectangularis 
 † Potomida tanaica   (uncertain, unassessed)
 † Potomida vukotinovici 
 † Potomida wilhelmi 
Synonyms
 Potomida altecarinatus (Penecke, 1883) †: synonym of Potomida altecarinata (Penecke, 1883) † (unaccepted > incorrect grammatical agreement of specific epithet)
 Potomida craiovensis (Tournouër, 1880) †: synonym of Psilunio craiovensis (Tournouër, 1880) †
 Potomida delesserti (Bourguignat, 1852): synonym of Potomida semirugata (Lamarck, 1819)
 Potomida mactreformis [sic] †: synonym of Potomida mactraeformis (Ionescu-Argetoaia, 1918) †
 Potomida neumayri (Penecke, 1883) †: synonym of Potomida jurisici (Brusina, 1896) † (unaccepted > junior homonym)
 Potomida ottiliae (Penecke, 1883) †: synonym of Psilunio (Psilunio) ottiliae (Penecke, 1883) † represented as Psilunio ottiliae (Penecke, 1883) † (unaccepted > superseded combination)
 Potomida prominulus [sic] †: synonym of Potomida prominula (Stefanescu, 1889) † (incorrect gender of specific epithet)
 Potomida slavonicus (M. Hörnes, 1865) †: synonym of Potomida slavonica (M. Hörnes, 1865) † (unaccepted > incorrect grammatical agreement of specific epithet)
 Potomida sturi (M. Hörnes, 1865) †: synonym of Bogatschevia sturi (M. Hörnes, 1865) † (unaccepted > superseded combination)
 Potomida tracheae (Kobelt & Rolle, 1895): synonym of Potomida semirugata (Lamarck, 1819)
 Potomida vukasovicianus (Brusina, 1874) †: synonym of Rytia vukasoviciana (Brusina, 1874) † (unaccepted > superseded combination)

References

 Modell, H. (1958). Die tertiären Najaden des ungarischen Beckens. Geologisches Jahrbuch. 75: 197-249.
 Starobogatov, Y. I. (1970). Fauna Molliuskov i Zoogeograficheskoe Raionirovanie Kontinental'nykh Vodoemov Zemnogo Shara
 Stefanescu, S. (1896). Études sur les Terrains tertiaires de Roumanie. Contribution a l'étude des faunes sarmatique, pontique et levantine. Mémoirs de la Société Géologique de France, Mémoir 15. Paléontologique. 6 (2-3), 1-147.

External links
 Swainson, W. (1840). A treatise on malacology or shells and shell-fish. London, Longman. viii + 419 pp

Unionidae
Bivalve genera